Sir David John Wright  (born 16 June 1944) is a former British diplomat who served as British Ambassador to Japan 1996–1999.

Early life
Wright was educated at Wolverhampton Grammar School, and at Peterhouse, University of Cambridge.

Diplomatic career
He joined the Foreign Office in 1966 and was posted as Third Secretary, later Second Secretary, to Tokyo. He returned to the FCO in 1972 and was promoted in London to First Secretary before attending the École nationale d'administration in Paris in 1975. From 1976 to 1980 he was posted as First Secretary to the Paris Embassy. He was seconded to be Private Secretary to the Secretary of the Cabinet (1980–1982), as a Grade 7 civil servant. From 1982-1985 he was Counsellor (Economic) in Tokyo.

Returning again to the FCO, he was Head of the Personnel Services Department from 1985 to 1988. From there he was seconded to be Deputy Private Secretary to the Prince of Wales (1988–1990).

Wright was appointed Ambassador to South Korea in 1990 and four years later returned to London as Deputy Under Secretary of State in the Foreign and Commonwealth Office. From 1996 to 1999 he was appointed Ambassador to Japan, a post which he left to become Chief Executive of British Trade International, which promotes British exports and inward investment. He retired in 2002.

As of 2014, he is the Chairman of the Governing Body of the Perse School, Cambridge.

Post retirement

After retiring from HM Diplomatic Service, Wright joined Barclays Capital, the investment banking arm of the Barclays group, as Vice Chairman where he is responsible for banking client relations in Asia-Pacific and Barclays links with UK government and other public entities. He is also Vice-President of the China-Britain Business Council, a member of the International Advisory Board of All Nippon Airways, and a Governor of the Royal Shakespeare Company. He is the current Chair at the Korean British Business Council.

As of December 2017, Wright is Chairman of the board at Skarbek Associates.

See also
Anglo-Japanese relations
Heads of the United Kingdom Mission in Japan

References

External links

1944 births
Living people
Alumni of Peterhouse, Cambridge
British diplomats in East Asia
English chief executives
Knights Grand Cross of the Order of St Michael and St George
Lieutenants of the Royal Victorian Order
Ambassadors of the United Kingdom to Japan
Ambassadors of the United Kingdom to South Korea
Members of HM Diplomatic Service
Members of the Household of the Prince of Wales
People educated at Wolverhampton Grammar School
People from Wolverhampton
20th-century British diplomats